The blackbelly garter snake (Thamnophis melanogaster) is a species of snake of the family Colubridae. It is found in Mexico.

Authority
First described as Tropidonotus melanogaster by Peters in 1864, this species is now recognized as Thamnophis melanogaster.

Geographic range
It is found on the Central Mexican Plateau at elevations between 1,158 and 2,545 m above sea level.

Description
The dorsal color of these snakes may be brown, olive green, gray, red, orange, or pink.  Ventral colors include the same as the dorsal, with the addition of yellow.  Dorsal patterns may include stripes and there is typically a black stripe running down the center of the belly, which explains both the common and scientific names for this species.  There is little or no difference in size between the sexes of Blackbelly garter snakes.

Habitat
This is a terrestrial species that occurs in temperate habitats.  Although it lives on land, it has not been found more than 15 m from a body of water.

Reproduction
Blackbelly garter snakes are ovoviviparous.

Diet
These snakes feed exclusively under water and they are the only known Thamnophis to prey on soft-bodied crayfish.  They have a highly variable diet that also includes fish, frogs, tadpoles, leeches, and earthworms.  Good underwater vision and chemical cues help the snakes find and capture their prey.

Subspecies
Four subspecies are known:
 gray blackbelly garter snake, T. m. canescens Smith, 1942
 Chihuahuan blackbelly garter snake, T. m. chihuahuaensis Tanner, 1959
 lined blackbelly garter snake, T. m. linearis Smith, Nixon & Smith, 1950
 Mexican blackbelly garter snake, T. m. melanogaster (Wiegmann, 1830)

Etymology
The specific name melanogaster is composed of two Greek words, melanos, which means black and gaster, which means belly.

Bibliography
 
 
 Peters, W. 1864. Über einige neue Säugethiere (Mormops, Macrotus, Vesperus, Molossus, Capromys), Amphibien (Plathydactylus, Otocryptis, Euprepes, Ungalia, Dromicus, Tropidonotus, Xenodon, Hylodes), und Fische Sillago, Sebastes, Channa, Myctophum, Carassius, Barbus, Mber. k. preuss. Akad. Wiss. Berlin [1864]: 381–399.
 Wiegmann, A. F. A. 1830. Preisverzeichnis der Säugethiere, Vögel, Amphibien, Fische und Krebse, welche von Hrn Deppe und Schiede in Mexico gesammelt worden. Berlin, 1.Sept. 1930.

References

External links 

 IUCN Range Map
 photos of Blackbelly garter snake
 iNaturalist Blackbelly Garter Snake page

Thamnophis
Reptiles described in 1864
Taxa named by Wilhelm Peters
Reptiles of Mexico